Audinet is a French surname. Notable people with the surname include:

André Audinet (1898–1948), French middle-distance runner
Jean Guillaume Audinet-Serville (1775–1858), French entomologist
Philip Audinet (1766–1837), English line-engraver

French-language surnames